A Chipmunk Christmas is a 1981 animated Christmas television special based on characters from Alvin and the Chipmunks.  Produced by Bagdasarian Productions in association with Chuck Jones Enterprises, it first aired on NBC December 14, 1981, nine years after the death of Alvin and the Chipmunks creator Ross Bagdasarian Sr. (also known as David Seville).  This was the first time that Alvin, Simon and David Seville were voiced by Ross Bagdasarian Jr. and the first time that Theodore was voiced by Janice Karman.

Plot 
The special starts out with a doctor visiting the family of a sick boy named Tommy. He admits that the chance of Tommy recovering before Christmas is bleak.

Meanwhile, the Chipmunks have a recording session. Alvin is not very happy about having to work on Christmas, but after Dave tells him that he can play his prized Golden Echo harmonica, he suggests that Dave can get everything set up in the studio while he and his brothers go window shopping. Dave agrees to this, and tells them not to be late.

At the music store, Alvin sees another Golden Echo harmonica, and tells his own harmonica that it's the best harmonica in the world. At that moment, Tommy's mother and sister arrive at the store, and he overhears Tommy's sister tell her mother that if Tommy had the Golden Echo harmonica, it would make him feel better. Alvin feels bad about Tommy's illness, so much that during the recording session, he can't sing in tune with the others. Dave gives the Chipmunks a break, so Alvin goes to Tommy's house and presents him with his (Alvin's) own harmonica, returning in time to finish the session.

Later, while the Chipmunks are decorating the tree, Simon and Theodore congratulate Alvin for what he did, and Alvin tells Simon and Theodore that they can't tell Dave about the harmonica, as Dave gave it to Alvin long ago, and Alvin is worried that Dave's feelings would be hurt if he learned what happened. Alvin plans to save his money and buy a new harmonica after Christmas, but when Dave gets a phone call from Carnegie Hall that they want Alvin to play his harmonica on Christmas Eve, Alvin is forced to make a plan to get enough money for a new harmonica.

The Chipmunks gather up all the dogs in the neighbourhood, and set up a photo booth, where children can have their photo taken with Santa Claus (Alvin). Unfortunately, the presence of a cat ruins the whole thing, and draws Dave's attention. As Simon and Theodore are unable to tell him the truth, Dave mistakes Alvin's actions for greed, and sends him to his room. This leads to a dream sequence involving Clyde Crashcup, who says that he has invented Christmas (which is now February 12) and Santa (Abraham Lincoln in a sleigh consisting of a hollowed-out pumpkin pulled by four elephants). Alvin tells him he needs money, and when Dave comes to check up on him, he is saying "money" in his sleep, causing Dave to give up.

On Christmas Eve, two hours before the concert, Simon and Theodore give Alvin the money they have saved up, and wish him luck on buying the harmonica. Upon being asked where Alvin is, they respond that he's not here right now. Luckily, just as Dave is complaining, he gets a phone call from Tommy's mother, who tells him about Alvin's harmonica and the wonders it worked for Tommy.

At the music store, Alvin is depressed, as he still doesn't have enough money for a new harmonica. Just then, a strange old woman appears, and buys it for him, only asking for a song in return, but disappearing by the end.

Dave, Simon, and Theodore arrive, and Dave apologizes to Alvin for mistaking his (Alvin's) actions for greed and tells him they have a surprise for him. At the concert, Alvin learns that Tommy has fully recovered, and he joins the Chipmunks on stage.

At the end, Santa Claus flies over the city (as the Chipmunks sing "We Wish You a Merry Christmas" in the background), before returning to the North Pole, where he is greeted by his wife - who is none other than the same old woman who bought Alvin the harmonica.

25th Anniversary Special Collector's Edition 
A 25th Anniversary Special Edition was released on September 26, 2006, from Bagdasarian Productions and Paramount Home Entertainment. The release featured a two-disc set including A Chipmunk Christmas plus the soundtrack on CD. In addition, the DVD contains two episodes from the 1983–1991 television show Alvin and the Chipmunks ("Dave's Wonderful Life" and "Merry Christmas, Mr. Carroll").

Voice actors and their characters
 Ross Bagdasarian Jr. – Alvin, Simon, David Seville
 Janice Karman – Theodore, Angela Waterford, Cindy Lou
 June Foray – Mrs. Claus, Mrs. Waterford
 Frank Welker – Santa Claus, Doctor
 Charles Berendt – Clyde Crashcup
 R. J. Williams – Tommy Waterford

Soundtrack album release 

A soundtrack album based on the television special was released in 1981. The album serves as the group's third Christmas album and their twelfth album overall.

The album peaked at number 72 on Billboards Pop Albums Chart and was certified gold by the Recording Industry Association of America, becoming the group's third and final gold album.

Between 1992 and 2001, the album, which was originally released as an LP, was re-released in cassette and Compact Disc formats.

Featured songs 
 "It's Beginning to Look a Lot Like Christmas"
 "Chipmunk Jingle Bells"
 "The Chipmunk Song Take 1" 
 "The Chipmunk Song (Christmas Don't Be Late)"
 "The Spirit of Christmas"
 "Have Yourself a Merry Little Christmas"
 "Crashcup Invents Christmas"
 "Here Comes Santa Claus (Right Down Santa Claus Lane)"
 "Silent Night"
 "Sleigh Ride"
 "Deck the Halls"
 "We Wish You a Merry Christmas"

See also
 List of Christmas films

References

External links
 
 
 

1981 Christmas albums
Christmas albums by American artists
Alvin and the Chipmunks albums
1980s American television specials
1980s animated television specials
1981 television specials
1981 in American television
NBC television specials
Santa Claus in television
RCA Records Christmas albums
Epic Records soundtracks
RCA Records soundtracks
American Christmas television specials
Films with screenplays by Ross Bagdasarian Jr.
Films produced by Ross Bagdasarian Jr.
Films with screenplays by Janice Karman
Films produced by Janice Karman